Zarabad (also Romanized as Zarābād; also known as Zarādād) is a village in Jakdan Rural District, in the Central District of Bashagard County, Hormozgan Province, Iran. At the 2006 census, its population was 163, in 40 families.

References 

Populated places in Bashagard County